The Kraków Museum of Insurance is a former museum in Kraków, Poland which was dedicated to insurances. It was established in 1987. It was the only such museum in existence devoted to all aspects of the history of insurance in Poland and in formerly Polish lands. The director of the museum was Marianna Halota. The collections of the museum encompassed two centuries of rare artifacts and memorabilia including over 35,000 historic documents and certificates from 28 countries.

References

External links 
 
 
 Homepage of Kraków Museum of Insurance at the Wayback Machine, 4 November 2011 webpage capture. Retrieved 24 June 2015.

Museums of economics
Museums in Kraków
Museums established in 1987
Museum of Insurance